Nabeshima Miki (October 23, 1844 – September 1, 1913) was a Japanese politician who served as governor of Hiroshima Prefecture in 1889–1896. He was governor of Tochigi Prefecture (1871–1880) and Aomori Prefecture (1886–1889).

Governors of Hiroshima
1844 births
1913 deaths
Japanese Home Ministry government officials
Governors of Tochigi Prefecture
Governors of Aomori Prefecture